Whulandary Herman (born June 26, 1987) is an Indonesian actress, television host, model and beauty pageant titleholder and beauty pageant titleholder. She was crowned Puteri Indonesia 2013 and represented her country at the Miss Universe 2013 pageant, where she advanced to the semifinals and placed in the Top 16, ending a 7-year drought for Indonesia. She is the second Indonesian and Sumatran to be called as Miss Universe Finalists after Artika Sari Devi who placed for the first time in Miss Universe 2005.

Early life
Herman was born and raised in Pariaman, West Sumatra and she finished her high school in Padang before moving to Jakarta. In 2007 she decided to move to Jakarta and started a career in modeling, which she also continued her education, studying communication.

Herman's step in modeling soared after competing in Wajah Femina 2008.

Pageantry

Puteri Indonesia 2012-2013
Herman, who stands , competed as the representative of West Sumatera. She and the other 37 contestants from 33 provinces competed for the title. Winning the title, she is the second woman from West Sumatra to win the Puteri Indonesia title. The first one was in 2002 with Melanie Putria won the title.

Miss Universe 2013

As the winner of Puteri Indonesia 2013, Herman represented Indonesia at the Miss Universe 2013 where she became the second Indonesian woman to place in the semifinals (after Artika Sari Devi in 2005), eventually finishing in the Top 16, 11th place overall. During the final swimsuit competition, she was one of only two semifinalists to wear a maillot one piece rather than the usual two-piece. However, she did wear a two piece for photo shoots throughout the pageant and also for Miss Universe 2013 official portrait shot by Fadil Berisha. She was also named 3rd Runner-Up in Best National Costume.

Filmography

Movies

Television

Awards and nomination

References

External links
 

Living people
1989 births
Minangkabau people
Miss Universe 2013 contestants
Indonesian beauty pageant winners
Puteri Indonesia winners
Indonesian female models
People from Pariaman
People from West Sumatra